Sante Flora e Lucilla may refer to:

Churches
Italy
Sante Flora e Lucilla, Arezzo
Sante Flora e Lucilla, Castel Focognano
Sante Flora e Lucilla, Montisi
Sante Flora e Lucilla, Santa Fiora
Sante Flora e Lucilla, Torrita di Siena